Depaul, de Paul or DePaul may refer to:

 Andy DePaul (born 1928), American amateur and professional boxer and referee
 Bobby DePaul (born 1963), American football coach
 Fernando de Paul (born 1991), Argentine footballer
 Gene de Paul (1919–1988), American pianist, composer and songwriter
 Katherine DePaul (born 1972), American artist manager
 Lyndsay DePaul (born 1988), American swimmer
 Lynsey de Paul (1950-2014), English singer-songwriter
 Rodrigo De Paul (born 1994), Argentine footballer
 Steven DePaul, American television director and producer
 Tony DePaul, American comic writer
 Vincent de Paul (1581–1660), Catholic priest and saint
 Vincent De Paul (actor) (born 1960), American actor and model
 William de Paul (born 1349), English Carmelite and bishop of Meath in Ireland

See also 

 De Paula